Francis John Spence (June 3, 1926 – July 27, 2011) was a Canadian Roman Catholic prelate. Spence served as the Archbishop of the Roman Catholic Archdiocese of Kingston from 1982 until his retirement in 2002.

Spence also served as vicar and ordinary for the Canadian Forces under the Military Ordinariate of Canada from 1986 to 1987.

Spence was born in Perth, Ontario, in 1926. He was ordained a Catholic priest on April 16, 1950. Archbishop Spence died on July 27, 2011, at the age of 85.

References

1926 births
2011 deaths
20th-century Roman Catholic archbishops in Canada
People from Perth, Ontario
Roman Catholic bishops of Charlottetown
21st-century Roman Catholic archbishops in Canada
Roman Catholic archbishops of Kingston, Canada